Seneca station was a Chicago, Rock Island and Pacific Railroad station in the small town of Seneca, Illinois. It was located on the south side of the track, just west of Main Street. The station is just west of a passing siding, one of only a few on the CSX New Rock Subdivision. The tracks also form a wye with a branch line to the Illinois River starting there. That line is rented by CSX, which has a lease with the International Mining Company until 2030.

References

External links
Historic American Engineering Record (HAER) No. IL-44, "Rock Island Railroad, Seneca Passenger Depot"
Picture on Flickr
Picture of Depot

Former Chicago, Rock Island and Pacific Railroad stations
Former railway stations in Illinois
Railway stations in LaSalle County, Illinois